Ƈ (minuscule: ƈ) is a letter of the Latin alphabet, derived from C with the addition of a hook. It is used in African languages such as Serer.

The minuscule ƈ was formerly used in the International Phonetic Alphabet to represent a voiceless palatal implosive. It was withdrawn in 1993.

In Unicode it is U+0187 (LATIN CAPITAL LETTER C WITH HOOK) and U+0188 (LATIN SMALL LETTER C WITH HOOK).

See also
Ɓ ɓ
Ɗ ɗ
Ɠ ɠ
Ƙ ƙ
Ƥ ƥ
Ƭ ƭ
Ƴ ƴ

Latin letters with diacritics
Phonetic transcription symbols